China Beach is an American dramatic television series.

China Beach may also refer to:
China Beach (Canada), a beach on Vancouver Island, British Columbia
China Beach, San Francisco, a small cove in San Francisco
 My Khe Beach, Da Nang, nicknamed China Beach by American soldiers
New Brighton State Beach or China Beach, a California cove

See also
Yakomo Beach, China, Kagoshima, Japan
:Category:Beaches of China